Monolith is the second album by Swedish melodic death metal band In Mourning. It was released in Europe on 25 January 2010 and in North America on February 16, 2010. It will be re-released on 24 July 2020 via Agonia Records.

Track listing

Credits

Musicians 
 Tobias Netzell – vocals, guitars
 Björn Pettersson – guitars
 Tim Nedergård – guitars
 Christian Netzell – drums
 Pierre Stam – bass

References 

2010 albums
In Mourning (band) albums